Khirbat Jiddin, known in the Kingdom of Jerusalem as Judin, was an Ottoman fortress in the western Upper Galilee, originally built by the Teutonic Order after 1220 as a crusader castle, 16 km northeast of the city of Acre, which at the time was the capital of the Kingdom of Jerusalem. The castle was destroyed by the Mamluk sultan Baibars sometime between 1268-1271 and lay in ruins until being rebuilt and expanded by the Arab ruler Zahir al-Umar as Qal'at Jiddin in the 1760s, only to be destroyed again around 1775 by Jazzar Pasha. The ruined fortress, known as Khirbat Jiddin, was later inhabited by the al-Suwaytat Bedouin tribe.
 
According to a 1945 census, there were 1500 Muslims living in the area. Khirbat Jiddin land totaled 7,587 dunums, of which however all but 34 were officially listed as non-cultivable; 4,238 were owned by Arabs and 3,349 dunums owned by Jews. Kibbutz Yehiam was established in the area in 1946. The establishment of the kibbutz is described on its own Wikipedia page.
 
Today the remains of the castle are the central part of Yehi'am Fortress National Park.

History

Byzantine period
The site was inhabited in the Byzantine period.

Crusader period
The Crusaders called the place Judin or Judyn. A Crusader castle was built there some time after May 1220, when the Teutonic Order acquired the nearby village of Shifaya.  The village fell to Sultan Baibars between 1268 and 1271. In 1283, Burchard of Mount Sion described a destroyed castle on the site that had belonged to the Teutonic Order.

Marino Sanuto, in 1322, still referred to it as a castle belonging to the Teutonic Knights.

The castle was built around two towers with an outer enclosure wall.

Ottoman period
The fortress as it now exists was built in the eighteenth century by Zahir al-Umar, the Bedouin ruler who became Ottoman governor of the Galilee. It was Zahir al-Umar who had the enclosure walls and towers constructed and the moat hewn out of the bedrock, together with an angled entrance gatehouse, vaulted in a manner faithful to the Crusader style. The vaulted hall on the lower level of the castle was the basement of a palatial residence that included a small mosque and a bathhouse.  The hall's roof rested on a series of square pillars on the hillside. The walls featured well shafts and gun-slits. The mosque was a small square building originally roofed with four cross-vaults resting on a central pillar. The bathhouse was a small building supplied with water from the wells below.

An Italian, Giovanni Mariti, who visited "Geddin" in the 1760s, says he was given a generous reception by the local sheik who guarded the place for Daher. Jezzar Pasha destroyed the fortress around 1775.

A map by Pierre Jacotin  from Napoleon's invasion of 1799 showed the place, named as Chateau de Geddin.

French explorer Victor Guérin visited in 1875, and described it:

"'Two great square towers, deprived of their upper stage, are still there, partly upright, and contain several chambers now in very bad condition. The staircases which lead to them have been deprived of part of their steps to make access more difficult. Underneath are magazines and cellars, the vaults of which rest on several ranges of arcades. Cisterns hollowed in the rock are found beneath a paved court. Below and near the castle a second inclosure, flanked by semicircular towers, contains within  it the remains of numerous demolished houses and cisterns.'"

When Kitchener inspected the place in 1877, he found it "quite unoccupied, though there are several chambers and vaults that could serve as habitations."

British Mandate
The ruins were later inhabited by Bedouin of the al-Suwaytat tribe whose primary occupation was animal husbandry. In the 1945 statistics, they also cultivated barley and tobacco on 22 dunums of land.  At the same time, Jews cultivated the remaining 32 dunums officially listed as cultivable.

The land ownership of the village in 1945, in dunams:

Types of land use in dunams in the village in 1945:

1948 War and aftermath

Khirbat Jiddin was in the territory envisaged as an Arab state in the 1947 UN Partition Plan. On July 11, 1948, during the 1948 Arab-Israeli War, it was captured by Israel's Sheva' Brigade as part of Operation Dekel.

See also
Yehiam convoy
Archeology of Israel
Depopulated Palestinian locations in Israel

References

Bibliography

  Cited in Khalidi, (1992)
  
 
 

 
 
 
 
  
 

   (p. 51)
   
Pringle, R. D., A. Petersen, M. Dow and C. Singer (1994), Qulʿat Jiddin: A castle of the Crusader and Ottoman periods in Galilee.  Levant, 26: 135–66.
  Also cited in Petersen (2001)

External links
  Palestine Remembered: Khirbat Jiddin
 Khirbat Jiddin, Zochrot
Survey of Western Palestine, Map 3:  IAA, Wikimedia commons 
 Official archaeology website: Yehiam National Park

District of Acre
Arab villages depopulated during the 1948 Arab–Israeli War
Castles of the Teutonic Knights